Huayna Capac (with many alternative transliterations; 1464/1468–1524) was the third Sapan Inka of the Inca Empire, born in Tumipampa sixth of the Hanan dynasty, and eleventh of the Inca civilization. Subjects commonly approached Sapa Inkas adding epithets and titles when addressing them, such as Wayna Qhapaq Inka Sapa'lla Tukuy Llaqt'a Uya "Unique Sovereign Wayna Qhapaq Listener to All Peoples". His original name was Titu Kusi Wallpa. He was the successor to Tupaq Inka Yupanki.

Background and family 
Names are in Quechua, which does not have a written form, so the same name may appear with many different spellings.The exact place and date of Wayna Qhapaq's birth are unknown. Though he was raised in Cusco, he may have been born in 1468 in Tumebamba (modern Cuenca) and have spent part of his childhood there. He was the son of Thupaq Inka (ruled 1471–1493) who had extended Inca rule north into present-day Ecuador, a process continued by Wayna Qhapaq.

Wayna Qhapaq's first wife was his full sister, Koya "Queen" Kusi Rimay. The couple produced no male heirs, but Wayna Qhapaq sired more than 50 legitimate sons, and about 200 illegitimate children with other women. Wayna Qhapaq took another sister, Rawa Okllo, as his royal wife. They had a son called Thupaq Kusi Wallpa, also known as Waskar.

Other sons included Ninan Kuyuchi (the Crown Prince), Atawallpa, Thupaq Wallpa, Manko Inka, Paullu Inka, Atoq, Konono, Wanka Auqui, Kizu Yupanqui, Tito Atauchi, Waman Wallpa, Kusi Wallpa, Tilka Yupanqu. Some of them later held the title of Sapan Inka, although some later Sapan Inka were installed by the Spaniards.

Among the daughters of Wayna Qhapaq were  Azarpay (the First Princess of the Empire), Kispe Sisa, Kura Okllu, Marca Chimbo, Pachacuti Yamqui, Miro, Kusi Warkay, Francisca Coya and others.

In addition to Kusi Rimay and Rawa Okllo, Wayna Qhapaq had more than 50 wives including Osika, Lari, Anawarque, Kontarwachu and Añas Qolque.:143

Administration
 
As a "boy chief" or "boy sovereign", Wayna Qhapaq had a tutor, Wallpaya,:218 a nephew of Inka Yupanki. This tutor's plot to assume the Incaship was discovered by his uncle, the Governor Waman Achachi, who had Wallpaya killed.

In the south, Wayna Qhapaq continued the expansion of the Inca Empire into what is now Chile and Argentina, and tried to annex territories towards the north in what is now Ecuador and southern Colombia.

In Ecuador, formerly known as the Kingdom of Quito, Wayna Qhapaq absorbed the Quito Confederation into the Inca Empire after marrying the Quito Queen Paccha Duchicela Shyris XVI in order to halt a long protracted war. From this marriage Atawallpa was born (1502 AD) in Caranqui, Ecuador. Atawallpa was to inherit the Kingdom of Quito, by the will of his father Wayna Qhapaq, and later Inca Emperor after defeating his brother, the Inca Emperor Waskar in the Inca Civil War, where Waskar Inka attempted to conquer the Kingdom of Quito after seven years of peace. Wayna Qhapaq became fond of Ecuador and spent most of his time there, founding cities like Atuntaqui. The capital of the empire was in Cuzco, and Wayna Qhapaq rebuilt Quito to make it the "second capital" of the empire.

As Sapa Inca, he also built astronomical observatories in Ecuador such as Ingapirca. Wayna Qhapaq hoped to establish a northern stronghold in the city of Tumebamba, Ecuador, where the Cañari people lived. In the Sacred Valley, the sparse remains of one of Wayna Qhapaq's estates and his country palace called Kispiwanka can still be found in the present-day town of Urubamba, Peru.

In what is now Bolivia, Wayna Qhapaq was responsible for developing Cochabamba as an important agriculture and administrative center, with more than two thousand silos (qullqas) for corn storage built in the area. Further north in Ecuador, Wayna Qhapaq's forces attempted to expand into the lowlands of the Amazon basin, reaching the Chinchipe River, but they were pushed back by the Shuar.

Wayna Qhapaq acquired a special fondness for the central Peruvian Andes and its local highlights; he is recorded as having spent time relaxing in the Chinchaycocha lake on the Bombon plateau. Many Inca rafts were brought to the lake directly from Ecuador for his amusement.

On its way to Cusco, after Wayna Qhapaq's death in Quito, the procession carrying his body stopped in the vicinity of Shawsha, a city in the central Peruvian Andes, acknowledging the fondness that he had felt for the region, and because the local inhabitants had been some of the most loyal to its causes.

The Inca empire reached the height of its size and power under his rule, stretching over much of what is now Bolivia, Peru, Argentina, Chile, Ecuador, and southwestern Colombia. It included varying terrain from high frozen Andes to the densest swamps. His subjects spanned more than two hundred distinct ethnic groups, each with their own customs and languages.

The Inca Empire or Tawantinsuyu ("the united four regions") was sophisticated for its time and place. At its height it had monumental cities, temples, marvellously-engineered stone fortresses, roads cut through granite mountain slopes, and massive agricultural terraces and hydraulic works. A dedicated ruler, Wayna Qhapaq did much to improve the lives of his people. In addition to building temples and other works, Wayna Qhapaq greatly expanded the road network. He had storehouses (qollqas) built along it for food so that aid could be quickly rushed to any who were in danger of starvation.

Wayna knew of the Spanish arrival off the coast of his empire as early as 1515.

Death and legacy
Wayna Qhapaq died in 1524. When Wayna returned to Quito he had already contracted a fever while campaigning in present-day Colombia (though some historians dispute this), likely resulting from the introduction of European disease like measles or smallpox, The Spaniards had carried a wide variety of deadly diseases to North, Central and South America; and the Native Americans had no acquired immunity against them. Millions of Central- and South Americans died in that epidemic including Wayna's brother, Auqui Tupac Inca, and Wayna's would-be successor and eldest son, Ninan Kuyuchi. According to some sources, his sons Atahualpa Inka and Huáscar Inka were granted two separate realms of the Inka Empire: his favorite Atahualpa, the northern portion centered on Quito; and his legitimate heir Huáscar, the southern portion centered on Cuzco. According to other sources, Atuahualpa was acting as provincial governor on behalf of his brother. The two sons reigned peacefully for four to five years before Huáscar (or Atahualpa) had second thoughts.

Huáscar quickly secured power in Cuzco and had his brother arrested but Atahualpa escaped from his imprisonment with the help of his wife. Atahualpa began securing support from Wayna Qhapaq's best generals, Chalkuchimac and Quizquiz, who happened to be near Quito, the nearest major city. Atahualpa rebelled against his brother and won the ensuing civil war and imprisoned Huáscar at the end of the war.

Pizarro and his men had the good fortune of ascending into the Andes just as Atahualpa was returning to Cuzco after the successful conclusion of his northern campaigns. After launching a surprise attack in Cajamarca and massacring upward of 6,000 Incan soldiers, Pizarro took Atahualpa prisoner. To secure his release, Atahualpa pledged to fill a room of approximately 88 cubic meters with precious golden objects, the famous Atahualpa's Ransom Room. Over the next months, trains of porters carted precious objects from across the empire. These including jars, pots, vessels, and huge golden plates pried off the walls of the Sun Temple of Qurikancha in Cuzco. On May 3, 1533, Pizarro ordered the vast accumulation of golden objects melted down, a process that took many weeks. Finally, on July 16, the melted loot was distributed among his men. Ten days later, Pizarro had Atahualpa executed.

Lost mummy
All the Inca emperors had their bodies mummified after death. Wayna Qhapaq's mummy was on display in his palace in Cuzco and was viewed by the Spanish conquistadors of the Inca Empire. Later, it was taken from Cuzco to his royal estate of Kispiwanka where it was hidden from the Spanish by Wayna Qhapaq's relatives and servants. At some point it was taken back to Cuzco, where it was discovered in 1559 by the Spanish. Along with mummies of 10 other Inca emperors and their wives, the mummy was taken to Lima where it was displayed in the San Andres Hospital. The mummies deteriorated in the damp climate of Lima and eventually they were either buried or destroyed by the Spanish.

An attempt to find the mummies of the Inca emperors beneath the San Andres hospital in 2001 was unsuccessful. The archaeologists found a crypt, but it was empty. The mummies may have been removed when the building was repaired after an earthquake.

References

Notes

Further reading

Sarmiento de Gamboa, Pedro. The History of the Incas. Austin: University of Texas Press, 2007. Originally published in Spanish in 1572. .
Helen Pugh, Intrepid Dudettes of the Inca Empire (2020) 

Inca emperors
People from Azuay Province
1464 births
1527 deaths
Deaths from smallpox
15th-century South American people
16th-century South American people
15th-century monarchs in South America
16th-century monarchs in South America